Passo dos Ventos is a Brazilian telenovela produced and broadcast by TV Globo. It premiered on 28 June 1968 and ended on 14 January 1969. It's the sixth "novela das oito" to be aired on the timeslot. It is written by Janete Clair and directed by Régis Cardoso

Cast 
 Glória Menezes as Vivien Chevalier
 Carlos Alberto as André Christophe
 Jorge Coutinho as Bienaire
 Djenane Machado as Hannah
 Theresa Amayo as Lien
 Joana Fomm as Linda
 Mário Lago as Jean Dubois
 Glauce Rocha as Bárbara

References

External links 
 

TV Globo telenovelas
1968 telenovelas
Brazilian telenovelas
1968 Brazilian television series debuts
1969 Brazilian television series endings
Portuguese-language telenovelas